Chang Chenmo River or Changchenmo River is a tributary of the Shyok River, part of the Indus River system. It is at the southern edge of the disputed Aksai Chin region and north of the Pangong Lake basin.

The source of Chang Chenmo is near the Lanak Pass in the Chinese-administered region of Kashmir (as part of the Rutog County in Tibet). 
The river flows west from Lanak La. At the middle of its course lies the Kongka Pass, part of the Line of Actual Control between India and China passes. 
Continuing west, the river enters a deep gorge in the Karakoram Range until it joins the Shyok River in Ladakh.

Name 
Chang Chenmo means "Great Northern" in Tibetic languages.
It is primarily the name of the valley rather than the river.

Geography 

The Chang Chenmo Valley lies in a depression between the Karakoram Range in the north and the Changchenmo Range in the south. The depression continues into Tibet, all the way to Yeshil Kul (Bangda Co) and Lake Lighten (Guozha Co) on the Khotan border.
The depression is now recognized as a geological fault called the Longmu Co fault, part of the larger Longmu–Guozha Co fault system.

The Chang Chenmo River has its origin in a glacier southwest of the Lanak Pass, which lies on a low ridge in the middle of the valley.
The southern mountains are much more glaciated than the north and possibly much of Changchenmo's waters are derived from them.

The Changchenmo flows on gravel bed for much of its course, described as "stony and bare". Numerous tributary streams flow into it from the north as well as the south, bringing alluvium. Grass grows in the alluvial beds, which is said to be used by the Ladakhis for autumn grazing. However, there is the ever-present danger of snowfall, which can cover up the grass. Unless the animals can be brought back over the high passes they would be in danger of starvation.

In the middle of the Changchenmo valley, a large spur of the Karakoram Range inserts itself, causing the river to zigzag its way through its hills. The Kongka Pass lies on the last of these hills. To the west of the spur, the large tributary of the Kugrang River flows into the river. To its east the Kyapsang River does the same. Three prominent grazing grounds are found to the west of the Kongka Pass, viz., Kyam (or Kiam, also called Hot Springs), Tsolu (or Tsogstalu), and Pamzal. Another one called Gogra is to the northwest in the Kugrang River valley, where another tributary called Changlung flows into Kugrang.

After Pamzal, the river enters a narrow gorge through the main Karakoram Range, where it becomes a rapid stream. This part of the valley is not traversable except in winter when the river is frozen.

Tributaries 
In Chinese-administered Aksai Chin, the Changchenmo is joined by Toglung Marpo, Kyapsang, and Silung Kongma.

It crosses the Line of Actual Control to Indian-administered Ladakh near the Kongka Pass. In Ladakh, it is joined by Silung Barma, Silung Yokma, Kugrang River,
Rimdi River,
and numerous other streams before flowing into the Shyok River.

History 

In the late 1800s, in order to facilitate trade between the Indian subcontinent and Tarim Basin, the British attempted to promote a caravan route via the Chang Chenmo Valley as an alternative to the difficult and tariffed Karakoram Pass. The Maharaja Ranbir Singh at the request of the British made improvements to the trails and facilities of the campsites in Chang Chenmo Valley. Unfortunately, in addition of being longer and higher elevation than the traditional route, this route also goes through the desolate desert of Aksai Chin. By 1890s, traders have mostly given up on this route. At the time, Chang Chenmo valley was also a popular hunting spot for British officers on leave.

Since the 1950s, the river is in the disputed territory between China and India. As such, it hosts numerous border outposts from both sides, such as Kongka Pass, Hot Springs, and Tsogstsalu. The region was also the site of numerous tensions in the past, such as the 1959 Kongka Pass incident.

References

Bibliography 
 
 

Rivers of Jammu and Kashmir
Rivers of Tibet
Indus basin